Matt Hagan is a professional NHRA funny car driver for Tony Stewart Racing. Most notably, he was the 2011, 2014 and 2020 NHRA Funny Car World Champion. He has had a total of 40 Career Event titles, 73 Career Final Rounds, and 21 Career No.1 qualifying positions. He is driver of the 14 Dodge Power Brokers Funny Car team led by Dickie Venables.

On October 14, 2021, Hagan was announced as the Funny Car driver for Tony Stewart Racing in 2022.

On September 1, 2017, Hagen was the second Nitro Funny Car driver to break the 3.800 E/T barrier with a 3.799@338.77MPH pass at Lucas Oil Raceway. That same pass made him the current Funny Car elapsed time record and top speed record holder at Lucas Oil Raceway.

References

1982 births
People from Christiansburg, Virginia
Living people
Racing drivers from Virginia
Dragster drivers